Laiyuan County is a county in western Hebei province, China, bordering Shanxi province to the west.

Administrative divisions
There are 7 towns and 10 townships under the county's administration.

Climate

Transportation 
China National Highway 108
China National Highway 112
China National Highway 207
G18 Rongcheng–Wuhai Expressway

External links

Geography of Baoding
County-level divisions of Hebei